Rheinland-Pfalz was a Bremen-class frigate of the German Navy.

Construction and commissioning
Rheinland-Pfalz was laid down in 1979 at the yards of Blohm+Voss, Hamburg and launched in September 1980. After undergoing trials she was commissioned on 9 May 1983.

Service

Early deployments
Rheinland-Pfalz was involved in several foreign missions since her commissioning. From 1992 to 1996 she was deployed several times in the Adriatic Sea as part of Operation Sharp Guard, blockading the former Yugoslavia. In 1999 she supported Operation Allied Force, the NATO bombing of Yugoslavia. In 2001 she was part of a Destroyer Exercise (DESEX), followed by a deployment in 2004 with Operation Enduring Freedom – Horn of Africa, and in the Gulf of Aden. Rheinland-Pfalz took part in Operation Active Endeavour in the Mediterranean in 2005, and in 2006 joined the South African naval exercises Good Hope II. In early 2009 she was briefly once more part of Operation Active Endeavour, before departing for the waters off the Horn of Africa to participate in Operation Atalanta, combatting piracy off the coast of Somalia. She relieved her sister ship Karlsruhe on patrol on 22 January 2009.

Operation Atalanta 2009

On 3 March at 7:12 local time, the 14,969 ton Antigua and Barbuda-registered container ship MV Courier, owned by a Bremen-based shipping company and manned by a Filipino crew, sent a distress message reporting the attack of pirates on board a small vessel. The assailants fired rocket propelled grenades and automatic rifles at the freighter. The emergency call was received by the Rheinland-Pfalz, which was located 50 nautical miles away. The German warship dispatched her Westland Lynx helicopter to the scene, which fired warning shots at the hostile launch. The Sea Lynx was joined by a Sikorsky SH-60 Seahawk from the US guided-missile cruiser USS Monterey. A couple of hours later, the pirate skiff was intercepted by the German frigate and seized by German marines, who captured nine suspects. The German boarding party found a cache of one rocket launcher, three AK-47 rifles, a Tokarev pistol, a carbine and an automatic rifle. This was the first time that the German Navy seized a hostile vessel and her crew at sea since the Second World War.

Early in the morning of 30 March 2009, a group of Somali pirates approached the German naval replenishment tanker Spessart, opened fire upon her and attempted to board the vessel. The attack was averted by the on-board security detachment, who opened fire on the pirates. A chase then ensued, ending with the pirates being stopped and detained by the  Rheinland-Pfalz. On 3 August 2009 the captured merchant vessel  was released from pirate control, with Rheinland-Pfalz and the frigate Brandenburg escorting her into port in Mombasa, Kenya.

Later service
Rheinland-Pfalz took part in exercises and manoeuvrers in 2011, and in February that year sailed to the Libyan coast to assist in the evacuation of German citizens caught up in the Libyan Civil War. On 5 March 2011 Rheinland-Pfalz entered the Tunisian port of Gabès, along with the Brandenburg and the replenishment ship Berlin, embarking several hundred Egyptian refugees and transporting them to Alexandria.

On 1 February 2012 Rheinland-Pfalz left her homeport to join Standing NATO Maritime Group 1 in the Mediterranean. This would be her last international deployment. On 11 September 2012 Rheinland-Pfalz was removed from active duty, and was officially decommissioned on 22 March 2013, the second ship of the Bremen class to leave service. In April 2017 Rheinland-Pfalz was auctioned off via the state-owned Vebeg GmbH for scrapping. In December 2017, the ship arrived at Aliağa for scrapping. A successor ship, a Baden-Württemberg-class frigate, was christened Rheinland-Pfalz on 24 May 2017 by Malu Dreyer, minister-president of Rhineland-Palatinate.

References

Bremen-class frigates
1980 ships
Ships built in Hamburg